Lee Sang-heon is a Korean name consisting of the family name Lee and the given name Sang-heon, and may also refer to:

 Lee Sang-hun (footballer) (born 1975), South Korean footballer
 Lee Sang-heon (footballer, born 1998), South Korean football midfielder